Kilkare Woods, also known as Kilcare Woods, is a small rural unincorporated community of about 773 people in southern Alameda County, California, near Pleasanton.

Kilkare Woods began as a private association of summer cottages. The town is only accessible through Sunol by Kilkare Road. 96% of residents of the ZIP code spoke English as their primary language, while 4% did not. Of those who did not, 3% spoke Hindi and 1% spoke Spanish. Kilkare Woods is served by the CAL FIRE and Livermore-Pleasanton fire departments. Students attend elementary school at Sunol Glen Elementary School in Sunol and high school at Foothill High School in Pleasanton. Law enforcement services are provided by the Alameda County Sheriff's Office.

References

Unincorporated communities in California
Unincorporated communities in Alameda County, California